The Power Macintosh 6100 (also sold as the Performa 6110 – 6118 and the Workgroup Server 6150) is a personal computer designed, manufactured and sold by Apple Computer from March 1994 to March 1996. It is the first computer from Apple to use the new PowerPC processor created by IBM and Motorola. The low-profile ("pizza-box") case was inherited from the Centris/Quadra 610 and 660AV models, and replaced the Macintosh Quadra series that used the Motorola 68040 processor, Apple's previous high-end workstation line.

For the consumer market, the 6100 was re-branded as a Macintosh Performa with model numbers in the 6110 – 6118 range denoting bundled software and hard drive sizes. An Apple Multiple Scan 15 Display and AppleDesign Keyboard were included as part of the package.  For the server market, a variant was offered with additional server software, called the Apple Workgroup Server 6150.

The 6100 was discontinued without a direct replacement.

Overview
The 6100 was introduced alongside the Power Macintosh 7100 and Power Macintosh 8100 and occupied the entry-level role of the new Power Macintosh family.

MacWorlds review of the 6100/60 noted that "Not only has Apple finally regained the performance lead it lost about eight years ago when PCs appeared using Intel's 80386 CPU, but it has pushed far ahead."  Performance of 680x0 software is slower due to the need for System 7.5's new Mac 68k emulation layer, but MacWorlds benchmarks showed noticeably faster CPU, disk, video and floating point performance than the Quadra 610 it replaced.

The 60 MHz models were upgraded to 66 MHz in January 1995. Apple also released a PC-compatible model of the 6100/66 called the Power Macintosh 6100 DOS Compatible. This version came with a PDS compatibility card with an Intel 80486 DX2/66 processor (without L2 cache) and a single SIMM RAM slot that uses the same type of RAM as in the 6100 itself.  The card supported up to 32 MB of RAM, a Creative Technology Vibra 16 sound chipset, and also included standard PC VGA and joystick ports. With this card, the 6100 is capable of running both the Mac OS interface and DOS/Windows 3.1 side-by-side, even on different monitors. The card could also use the main system RAM if there was no SIMM installed on the card.

Notable were the new startup and "sad Mac" chimes: instead of the electronic "chuff" that was used on the previous generation machines, it played a guitar chord strummed by jazz guitarist Stanley Jordan, and instead of the "Chimes of Doom" arpeggio that played when there was a hardware error at startup, there was the sound of a car crashing and glass breaking.

This and the other NuBus-based Power Macintosh models (7100, 8100 and Workgroup Server 9150) were replaced by the Power Macintosh PCI series released in 1995, although the 6100 DOS compatible continued in production until 1996.  By this time Apple had already released the anticipated "PC Personality Card" that plugged into one of the PCI slots of the newer Power Macs, featuring a 100 MHz Pentium processor.

The 6100 was the slowest Power Macintosh in terms of processor speed upon introduction. Eventually, the 6100 series was able to be upgraded through third-party solutions such as Sonnet Technologies Crescendo G3 NuBus (up to 500 MHz) and G4 NuBus (up to 360 MHz; discontinued) and Newer Technology's MaxPower G3 processor upgrades.

Early models had a CD eject button that would stick in. This was rectified on later models with a subtly re-profiled button moulding.

Models
The original Power Macintosh 6100 is based on the 60 MHz PowerPC 601 processor. The base model was complemented by an AV version, which included an add-on card fitted in its Processor Direct Slot that added audio and visual enhancements such as composite and S-video input/output and full 48 kHz 16-bit DAT-resolution sound processing.  A double-speed CD-ROM is included as standard.

A series of Performa models based on the 6100/60 were shipped in October 1994, collectively known as the "Performa 6100 series."  All Performas included an Apple Multiple Scan 15 Display, an AppleDesign Keyboard, and a suite of pre-installed software including Quicken, MacLinkPlus, American Heritage Dictionary, and Apple's eWorld online service.  CD-ROMs included with all Performas included Electronic Arts' 3D World Atlas and a variety of software for children.  The Performas vary only in their hard drive size and which of two software bundles are included.

Software bundle 1: ClarisWorks, clip art collections, and Now Software's Up-To-Date and Contact.
Software bundle 2: Microsoft Works, Mavis Beacon Teaches Typing, Kid Works, Thinkin' Things, The Writing Center, Fractal Dabbler, Spaceway 2000, San Diego Zoo Presents... the Animals!, Wacky Jacks CD Gameshow.

Introduced March 14, 1994:
 Power Macintosh 6100/60
 Power Macintosh 6100/60AV

Introduced April 25, 1994:
 Apple Workgroup Server 6150

Introduced November 1, 1994:
 Macintosh Performa 6110CD: Same specifications as the 6100/60; includes System 7.5 and a 250 MB hard drive.  Includes software bundle #1.
 Macintosh Performa 6112CD: Same specifications as the 6100/60; includes System 7.5 and a 250 MB hard drive.  Includes software bundle #2.
 Macintosh Performa 6115CD: Same specifications as the 6100/60; includes System 7.5 and a 350 MB hard drive.  Includes software bundle #1.
 Macintosh Performa 6117CD: Same specifications as the 6100/60; shipped with System 7.5.1 and a 700 MB hard drive
 Macintosh Performa 6118CD: Same specifications as the 6100/60; includes System 7.5 and a 500 MB hard drive.  Includes both software bundles.

Introduced January 3, 1995:
 Power Macintosh 6100/66
 Power Macintosh 6100/66AV
 Power Macintosh 6100/66 DOS Compatible

Introduced April 3, 1995:
 Apple Workgroup Server 6150/66

Introduced July 17, 1995:
 Macintosh Performa 6116CD: Same specifications as the 6100/60; shipped with System 7.5.1 and a 350 MB hard drive

Specifications
Codename: Piltdown Man
CPU: PowerPC 601
CPU Speed: 60/66 MHz
FPU: integrated
Bus Architecture: NuBus
Bus Speed: 30/33 MHz
Data Path: 64 bit
ROM: 4 MB Old World ROM
RAM Type: 72 pin EDO or FPM SIMMs (install in pairs of equal MB amounts and equal types)
Maximum (fastest) RAM Speed: 60 ns
Minimum (slowest) RAM Speed: 80 ns
Onboard RAM: 8 MB soldered to logic board
RAM Slots: 2
Maximum RAM: 72 MB (Apple's old official amount), 264 MB (with two 128 MB SIMMs)
Level 1 Cache: 16 KB data, 16 KB instruction (32 KB total)
Level 2 Cache: optional
VRAM: 640 KB DRAM "borrowed" from system RAM (2 MB w/ Power Macintosh AV card)
Maximum Resolution: 1152×870 at 256 colors and 800x600 at thousands of colors (w/ AV card)
Slots: PDS or 7" NuBus (AV card fills both)
Floppy Drive: 1.44 MB SuperDrive
Optical Drive: optional 2× CD-ROM Apple 300i (internal 50-pin SCSI)
Hard Disk: 120 MB - 700 MB (internal 50-pin SCSI)
Ethernet: AAUI-15
ADB: 1
Serial: 2 (printer & fax/modem)
SCSI: DB-25
Video Out: HDI-45
Audio Out: stereo 16 bit mini
Audio In: stereo 16 bit mini
Speaker(s): mono
Gestalt ID: 75
Power: 210 watts
Weight: 14.5 lb (7 kg)
Dimensions: 3.4" H × 16.3" W × 15.6" D (86 mm × 414 mm × 396 mm)
Minimum OS: 7.1.2 (60 MHz version), 7.5 (66 MHz version), MS-DOS 6.22 and Windows 3.1 (66 MHz PC Compatible model on DOS Compatibility card)
Maximum OS: 9.1

References

External links

 Power Mac 6100 Upgrade Guide
 Power Mac 6100 Service Guide

6100
Macintosh Performa
6100
Macintosh desktops
Computer-related introductions in 1994

it:Power Macintosh 6100